Winter sports in the United States are popular, both professionally and recreationally. Most of this activity takes place in the northern half of the country.

Sports

Curling
Once popular only in "the upper midwest and small pockets of New England", curling is gradually making inroads in the rest of the country.

Figure skating

The governing body of figure skating in the United States is US Figure Skating,"U.S. Figure Skating is a member of the International Skating Union (ISU), the international federation for figure skating; and the United States Olympic & Paralympic Committee (USOPC).

Ice skating used to be a popular television sport in the United States but has fallen out of favor since the 1970s, and the number of medals they have won at the winter Olympics has declined.

Ice hockey

Twenty-four of the thirty-one National Hockey League teams are based in the United States, the other seven in Canada.

Skiing
Skiing remains a billion-dollar industry, but according to Snowsports Industry of America, its popularity peaked in the winter of 2010–11, with 11.5 million alpine skiers, and has declined since.

Sledding

Historically the United States has not been a world power in bobsledding. USA Bobsled are the governing body for bobsledding in the United States.

Kaillie Humphries is one the most successful bobsledders for the United States.

Snowboarding

Snowboarding was once a popular and trendy sport among the youth of America in the 1990s and 2000s, but has declined in popularity since the early 2010s due to the expense of the sport.

Winter Olympics

The United States is a traditional powerhouse in the Winter Olympics. However, the 2018 Winter Olympics saw the country's worst performance in terms of medals in 20 years.

Participation
Winter sports are underrepresented by ethnic minorities due to the fact that such sports are expensive to play.

Events
 Iditarod Trail Sled Dog Race, an annual long-distance sled dog race run in early March from Anchorage to Nome, entirely in the state of Alaska

References

 
United States
Sports